The 14619 / 14620 Tripura Sundari Express is a weekly Express train belonging to Northern Railway Zone of India, that runs between the cities, Agartala in (Tripura) and Firozpur in (Punjab) state. It is currently being operated with 14619/14620 train numbers on a weekly basis.

Overview

The train is named after the famous Tripura Sundari Temple in Agartala.

Route
TRIPURA
 (Starts)

ASSAM

New Karimganj

Jagiroad

WEST BENGAL
New Jalpaiguri (Siliguri)

BIHAR

UTTAR PRADESH

DELHI

HARAYANA

Mandi Adampur

Kalanwali

PUNJAB

(Ends)

Classes
The train consists of LHB coach.

Coach composition

Loco Link

1.

2.

See also

Bangalore Cantonment–Agartala Humsafar Express
Sealdah–Agartala Kanchenjunga Express
Agartala–Anand Vihar Terminal Rajdhani Express
Deoghar–Agartala Weekly Express
 Indian locomotives

References

Transport in Agartala
Transport in Delhi
Railway services introduced in 2016
Named passenger trains of India
Rail transport in Uttar Pradesh
Rail transport in Bihar
Rail transport in West Bengal
Rail transport in Assam
Rail transport in Delhi
Rail transport in Tripura
Express trains in India